2007 Kabaddi World Cup was the second edition of the Kabaddi World Cup and also the second one hosted by India. Host India won the World Cup by defeating Iran 29-19 in the Final. A total of 14 originally 16 teams took part in the competition out of which 11 were Asian.

Teams

Pools
The teams were divided into four pools of four teams each.
However, Pakistan and Kyrgyzstan never took part in the tournament.

Competition format
Sixteen teams competed in tournament consisting of two rounds. In the first round, teams were divided into four pools of four teams each, and followed round-robin format with each of the team playing all other teams in the pool once.
Following the completion of the league matches, teams placed first and second in each pool advanced to a single elimination round consisting of four quarterfinals, two semifinal games, and a final.

Schedule
All matches' timings were according to Indian Standard Time (UTC +5:30).

Knockout stage

Quarter-finals

Semi-final

Final

External links
 Results of Kabaddi World Cup 2007
 Schedule of Kabaddi World Cup 2007

Kabaddi World Cup, 2007
Kabaddi World Cup
Kabaddi competitions in India
Sport in Maharashtra